Suzanna Hext (born ) is a British swimmer and equestrian, who won three gold medals in dressage at the 2017 FEI European Championships, and two medals at the 2019 World Para Swimming Championships. She finished fourth in two S5 swimming events at the 2020 Summer Paralympics.

Personal life
Hext is from Truro, Cornwall. and has also lived near Sherston, Wiltshire. In 2012, she was paralysed in a horse riding accident, and required the use of a wheelchair. She watched the 2012 Summer Paralympics from her hospital bed. In November 2021, she had a cochlear implant, which allowed her to hear again. In her spare time, Hext volunteers for the Wiltshire Air Ambulance.

Equestrian career
In equestrian, Hext competes in the Grade III classification. She won three gold medals in dressage at the 2017 FEI European Championships, winning the individual, team and freestyle events. She competed in the team event alongside Sophie Wells, Erin Orford and Julie Payne, and it was her first European Championship.

Swimming career
Hext started swimming in 2017, and she now trains at Swindon swimming club, and at the Manchester Aquatics Centre. She is the British record holder in S5 50 metre and 100 metre freestyle events, and in S4 100 metre backstroke. At the 2019 World Para Swimming Championships, Hext came second in the 50 metre freestyle event, and third in the 100 metre freestyle competition. In 2020, she decided to participate in swimming qualifying for the 2020 Summer Paralympics, rather than equestrian. During the COVID-19 pandemic, she turned her parents' house into a gym, and was able to use jockey AP McCoy's private pool, as well as swimming in the Cornish sea.

At the 2020 Summer Paralympics, Hext had an asthma attack that caused her to be hospitalised. As a result, she was withdrawn from the British team for the mixed 4 × 50 metre freestyle relay 20pts. She came fourth in the finals of the 200 metre freestyle S5 and 100 metre freestyle S5 events. After further asthma attacks, Hext withdrew from the 100m breaststroke SB4 and 50m backstroke S5 events.

Hext did not compete at the 2022 World Para Swimming Championships after developing sepsis whilst training in Lanzarote, Canary Islands.

References

External links

British Swimming

1980s births
Living people
British female freestyle swimmers
British female equestrians
Paralympic swimmers of Great Britain
Swimmers at the 2020 Summer Paralympics
Sportspeople from Truro
Medalists at the World Para Swimming Championships
S5-classified Paralympic swimmers
People educated at Millfield